Frederick William Pirie (February 1, 1893 – October 3, 1956) was an industrialist and political figure in New Brunswick.

Born in Red Rapids, New Brunswick, Frederick Pirie represented Victoria County in the Legislative Assembly of New Brunswick as a Liberal member from 1930 to 1945. He served as Minister of Lands and Mines in the province's Executive Council from 1935 to 1945.

He went on the represent Victoria-Carleton division in the Senate of Canada from 1945 to 1956. He died in office at the age of 63.

References 
 

1893 births
1956 deaths
Members of the Executive Council of New Brunswick
Canadian senators from New Brunswick
People from Victoria County, New Brunswick
New Brunswick Liberal Association MLAs